Barmak is a village in Zirrah Rural District, Sadabad District, Dashtestan County, Bushehr Province, Iran. At the 2006 census, its population was 621, in 154 families.

References 

Populated places in Dashtestan County